Nikoi may refer to:
 Gloria Amon Nikoi, a Ghanaian politician born in 1930
 Nikoi Island, Indonesia